was a village located in Monbetsu District, Abashiri Subprefecture (now Okhotsk Subprefecture), Hokkaido, Japan.

As of 2004, the village had an estimated population of 1,305 and a population density of 3.81 persons per km2. The total area was 342.96 km2.

On October 1, 2005, Shirataki, along with the towns of Ikutahara and Maruseppu (all from Monbetsu District), was merged into the expanded town of Engaru.

An Upper Palaeolithic site at Shirataki is the source of some Yubetsu technique stone blades dating from c 13,000 years ago.

Shirataki is considered the birthplace of Aikido. Leading a group of settlers, Morihei Ueshiba refined his martial art and developed the techniques he would later call Aikido.

Climate

References

Dissolved municipalities of Hokkaido